Iskufilan is a small town in the southern Gedo region of Somalia. It is situated between Bardera and El Adde, in the autonomous Jubaland region. It has a primary school and a hospital. The town is settled mainly by the Shirwac Diini subclan of the larger Marehan clan.

References

Populated places in Gedo